Manie van Zyl (21 January 1929 – 5 August 2012) was a South African wrestler. He competed at the 1956 Summer Olympics and the 1960 Summer Olympics.

References

1929 births
2012 deaths
South African male sport wrestlers
Olympic wrestlers of South Africa
Wrestlers at the 1956 Summer Olympics
Wrestlers at the 1960 Summer Olympics
People from Modimolle Local Municipality
Commonwealth Games medallists in wrestling
Commonwealth Games gold medallists for South Africa
Wrestlers at the 1954 British Empire and Commonwealth Games
Wrestlers at the 1958 British Empire and Commonwealth Games
Sportspeople from Limpopo
Medallists at the 1954 British Empire and Commonwealth Games
Medallists at the 1958 British Empire and Commonwealth Games